The Evansville Race Riot occurred in July 1903 in Evansville, Indiana and was the worst riot in the city's history. The riots occurred after a black man shot and killed a white policeman and ultimately resulted in 12 deaths.

On July 3, an African-American man named Lee Brown, aka Robert Lee, had a dispute with another African-American man, Tom Berry, at a bar and attempted to return to the bar with a gun but was stopped by Louis N. Massey, the most senior policeman on the force. Massey attempted to arrest Brown but Brown shot and fatally wounded Massey, however Massey was able to fire back before dying, wounding Brown who eventually succumbed to injuries as well on July 31. A mob of several thousand citizens (mostly all white) formed outside the Vanderburgh County Jail on July 6 and attempted to storm the jail with the intention of lynching Brown and 16 other black inmates. Around 200 militiamen then opened fire on the mob, killing and injuring several rioters. The crowd then began looting hardware stores of weapons and stormed into black neighborhoods in an attempt to expel black people from Evansville. The rioting continued until July 10 and a total of 12 people died during the riot, with more than 40 others seriously wounded and about 2,000 of Evansville's 8,000 black residents fleeing the city.
It is unclear as to whether the mob or the militia were to blame for the deaths. Several accounts describe the escalation as coming to a head after a rock was thrown by someone in the crowd, at the militia, who in turn fired warning shots which caused chaos.
 
Excerpt - "Two more deaths added to the list. Frank Lamble and Charles Taylor pass away last night - first funeral held today. Two more deaths were added to the list of fatalities resulting from the shooting of Monday night, last evening Frank Lamble and Charles Taylor, passing away from the effect of the wounds received. This makes a total of nine deaths so far, and the list will most likely swell to ten. FRANK LAMBLE - The death of Lamble took place last evening about 5 o'clock at the Gilbert Sanitarium where he had been since the shooting. His death was caused by the bullet wound which struck him in the chin and ranged downward... He was unconscious from the first and never recovered sufficiently to talk of the occurrence or to give any information of how he was shot...."

The people killed during the riot were:

Edward Schiffman, 28, painter
Hazel Allman, 15, killed while driving with her parents
August Jordan, 21, musician
Ed Ruhl, 23, laborer
Joseph Tech "Peck", middle-aged
Robert W. Bock, 24, (Originally thought to be H.E.Johnson)
Fred Kappler, 15
Frank Lamble, 23, stove molder 
John Barnett, 20
John Geil
Earnest Walters
Charles Taylor, factory hand
Calvin Hawkins, 26

See also
List of incidents of civil unrest in the United States

References

1903 in Indiana
1903 riots
Riots and civil disorder in Indiana
Racially motivated violence against African Americans
White American riots in the United States
July 1903 events
Evansville, Indiana
Killings by law enforcement officers in the United States
History of racism in Indiana
Mass murder in 1903